Fabiano Peçanha (born June 5, 1982 in Cruz Alta, Rio Grande do Sul) is a Brazilian middle distance runner. He is a quadruple South American champion in 800 metres and 1500 metres. Peçanha studied at the Lutheran University of Brazil and represented his country at four consecutive Summer Universiades, winning six medals.  He has also represented Brazil at two Olympics (2008 and 2012), reaching the semi-final on both occasions.

Personal bests
800 metres - 1:44.60 
1500 metres - 3:38.45 (2004)

Competition record

1: Running out of competition.

References

External links

Athlete's webpage (in Portuguese)

Sportspeople from Rio Grande do Sul
Brazilian male middle-distance runners
1982 births
Living people
Athletes (track and field) at the 2003 Pan American Games
Athletes (track and field) at the 2007 Pan American Games
Athletes (track and field) at the 2008 Summer Olympics
Athletes (track and field) at the 2012 Summer Olympics
Olympic athletes of Brazil
Pan American Games athletes for Brazil
Pan American Games bronze medalists for Brazil
Pan American Games medalists in athletics (track and field)
Universiade medalists in athletics (track and field)
Universiade gold medalists for Brazil
Universiade silver medalists for Brazil
Universiade bronze medalists for Brazil
Medalists at the 2005 Summer Universiade
Medalists at the 2003 Summer Universiade
Medalists at the 2007 Summer Universiade
Medalists at the 2009 Summer Universiade
Medalists at the 2003 Pan American Games
Medalists at the 2007 Pan American Games
21st-century Brazilian people
20th-century Brazilian people